Primrose Lake is a large lake in the Canadian provinces of Saskatchewan and Alberta in the Churchill River drainage basin. The lake straddles the Saskatchewan / Alberta border, with most of the water surface in Saskatchewan with only the south-west corner of the lake in Alberta. It is north of the better known Cold Lake, which also straddles the border.

It lies within muskeg and the boreal forest ecozone of Canada There are several rivers and creeks that flow into the lake with Calder River on the northern shore being the primary inflow. Martineau River is the lake's outflow and it starts on the southern shore and flows in a south-westerly direction into Cold Lake in Alberta. To the east of the lake are the Mostoos Hills. Besides the aforementioned Martineau River and Cold Lake, the waters of Primrose Lake flow through multiple rivers and lakes en route to the Churchill River, including Cold River, Pierce Lake, Lepine Lake, Lac des Îles, Waterhen River, Waterhen Lake, Beaver River, and Lac Île-à-la-Crosse.

Important Bird Area 
A total of 1,259.52km² of Primrose Lake and the surrounding area is designated an Important Bird Area (IBA) of Canada (SK 092 Primrose Lake). Most of the IBA is in Saskatchewan but the western boundary is in Alberta.

Launch Site
The south-west corner of Primrose Lake in Alberta was used as launch site for sounding rockets of the types super Loki and Arcas in Canada. The first launch was on 5 April 1968 and the last one was 11 September 1991.

Fish species
The fish species include walleye, sauger, yellow perch, northern pike, lake trout, lake whitefish, cisco, white sucker, longnose sucker, and burbot.

See also
List of lakes of Saskatchewan
List of lakes of Alberta

References

External links 
Fish Species of Saskatchewan

Lakes of Alberta
Lakes of Saskatchewan
Borders of Alberta
Borders of Saskatchewan
Division No. 18, Saskatchewan
Municipal District of Bonnyville No. 87
Important Bird Areas of Saskatchewan